Viorel Bubău (born 3 May 1961) is a Romanian equestrian. He competed in the individual eventing at the 2004 Summer Olympics.

References

External links
 

1961 births
Living people
Romanian male equestrians
Olympic equestrians of Romania
Equestrians at the 2004 Summer Olympics
Place of birth missing (living people)